Patrick Baskerville (born November 1833) was an Ontario businessman and political figure. He represented the riding of Ottawa in the Legislative Assembly of Ontario from 1879 to 1886 as a Conservative member.

He was born in Ballyrusheen, County Tipperary, Ireland in 1833, the son of George Baskerville, a farmer, and came to Bytown with his family in 1847. Baskerville worked at farming and the timber trade, before becoming a clerk with the Bytown and Prescott Railway in 1854. In 1862, he became a merchant, selling groceries. His three brothers joined the business as partners in 1870.

External links 
A Cyclopæedia of Canadian biography : being chiefly men of the time ..., GM Rose (1886)
Member's parliamentary history for the Legislative Assembly of Ontario

1833 births
Progressive Conservative Party of Ontario MPPs
Irish emigrants to Canada (before 1923)
Year of death missing
Politicians from County Tipperary